Naulila is a town and commune in the municipality of Ombadja, province of Cunene, Angola.

Located on the Cunene River which separates Angola and Namibia, Naulila was the scene of fighting between Portuguese Angola and German South West Africa during the early stages of World War I. On 19 October 1914, a German military column crossed the border and entered Angola without authorisation from the Portuguese authorities. The column was intercepted by Portuguese forces and conducted to Fort Naulila. At Naulila, a dispute occurred between the Portuguese and the Germans which resulted in the deaths of three German officers.

On 31 October, the Germans under the command of Oswald Ostermann retaliated, and raided the Portuguese fort at Cuangar with the use of machine guns, in which the fort was destroyed and the majority of the border guards killed. This was later referred to as the "Cuangar Massacre". On 18/19 December, Victor Franke led a successful retaliatory attack, defeating the Portuguese at Naulila.

Legacy
Today, in the town of Outjo, Namibia, there is a monument and a cemetery commemorating German losses in the incidents at Naulila in 1914.

References
Chronology of Events in German Southwest Africa in 1914
Chronology of Events in the Defense of the Portuguese African Colonies, 1914 - 1920
 Historicus Africanus: "Der 1. Weltkrieg in Deutsch-Südwestafrika 1914/15", Volume 2, "Naulia", Windhoek 2012, 

Populated places in Cunene Province
Communes in Cunene Province